Steven Warren Gangestad is an American evolutionary psychologist who is Distinguished Professor Emeritus in the Department of Psychology at the University of New Mexico. With his University of New Mexico colleague Randy Thornhill, he has conducted considerable research pointing to the existence of concealed ovulation in humans.

References

External links
Faculty page

Evolutionary psychologists
Living people
Stanford University alumni
21st-century American psychologists
University of Minnesota alumni
University of New Mexico faculty
Year of birth missing (living people)